Studdards Crossroads is an unincorporated community in Fayette County, Alabama, United States.

History
The community is likely named after Andrew Studdard, who was given a grant to the surrounding land in 1860.

References

Unincorporated communities in Fayette County, Alabama
Unincorporated communities in Alabama